Lame Deer (Meaveʼhoʼeno in Cheyenne) is a census-designated place (CDP) in Rosebud County, Montana, United States. The community is named after Miniconjou Lakota chief Lame Deer, who was killed by the U.S. Army in 1877 under a flag of truce south of the town. It was the site of a trading post from the late 1870s.

It is the tribal and government agency headquarters of the Northern Cheyenne Indian Reservation. This is the location of the Chief Dull Knife College and the annual Northern Cheyenne Powwow.

Geography 
Lame Deer is located at (45.621819, -106.658079).

Climate
According to the Köppen Climate Classification system, Lame Deer has a semi-arid climate, abbreviated "BSk" on climate maps.

Demographics 

As of the census of 2010, there were 2,052 people, 521 households, and 401 families residing in the CDP. The population density was 36.3 people per square mile (14.0/km2). There are a total of 613 housing units, which makes at an average density of 10.3 per square mile (4.0/km2). The racial makeup was 93.7% Native American, 4.3% White, 0.03% African American, 0.01% Asian, 0.2% from other races, and 1.4% from two or more races.  Hispanic or Latino of any race were 3.4% of the population.

Of the 521 households, 40.9% had children under the age of 18 living with them, 36.5% were married couples living together, 26.9% had a female householder with no husband present, and 23.0% were non-families. 19.4% of the households had someone living alone who was 65 years of age or older. The average household size was 3.90 and the average family size was 4.53.

The population was spread out, with 43.7% under the age of 18, 55.1% 21 or older and 5.6% who were 65 years of age or older. The median age was 23.9 years. For every 100 females there were 93.7 males. For every 100 females age 18 and over, there were 95.2 males.

The median household income was $28,700 and the median income for a family was $32,039 43.1% of the population were below the poverty line, including 45.8% of those under the age of 18 and 46.9% of those 65 and older.

Education and culture 
The Northern Cheyenne Arts and Crafts Center, Charging Horse Casino and Cafe, and Lame Deer Museum are located here.

Chief Dull Knife College is a Native American tribal community college and land grant institution located in Lame Deer.

The main office of the National Indigenous Women's Resource Center, which works to prevent family violence, is located in Lame Deer.

The Lame Deer High School Morningstars play in the 3B conference with the Baker Spartans, Colstrip Colts, Forsyth Dogies, St. Labre Braves, and Broadus Hawks.

References

External links

 Northern Cheyenne Tribe
 Lame Deer Flag Song and translation (sound files)

Census-designated places in Rosebud County, Montana
Northern Cheyenne Tribe